William Wishart may refer to:

 William Wishart, 13th century Scottish bishop of St Andrews
 William Wishart (primus), University of Edinburgh principal 1716-1730
 William Wishart (secundus), University of Edinburgh principal 1736-1754
 William Wishart Biddle, an American psychologist